John Hsu may refer to:
 John Hsu (musician)
 John Hsu (filmmaker)